Nataša Anđelić (Serbian Cyrillic: Наташа Анђелић, born July 11, 1977, in Novi Sad, SFR Yugoslavia) is a former Serbian female basketball player.

External links
 Profile at eurobasket.com

1977 births
Living people
Basketball players from Novi Sad
Serbian women's basketball players
Shooting guards
Small forwards
ŽKK Crvena zvezda players
ŽKK Vojvodina players
ŽKK Vršac players
Serbian expatriate basketball people in Russia
Serbian expatriate basketball people in Montenegro
Serbian expatriate basketball people in Bosnia and Herzegovina
Serbian expatriate basketball people in Italy
Serbian expatriate basketball people in Israel
Serbian expatriate basketball people in Cyprus